Javier Ramírez Abeja (born March 14, 1978 in Carmona, Spain) is a Spanish former cyclist.

Major results

2002
 1st GP Macario
 1st Clásica Memorial Txuma
2003
 1st  Overall Vuelta Ciclista a León
1st Stage 2
 1st Copa de España
 1st Trofeo Guerrita
2005
 5th Overall Tour Down Under
 9th Circuito de Getxo
2007
 4th Subida al Naranco
2008
 1st Memorial Manuel Sanroma
 2nd Volta a Tarragona
2011
 8th Overall Tour of Qinghai Lake
2012
 1st  Overall Tour of Iran (Azerbaijan)
1st Stages 1 & 5
 1st Stage 7 Vuelta Ciclista de Chile
 1st Stage 1 Vuelta a Andalucía
 4th Overall Tour of Qinghai Lake

Grand Tour general classification results timeline

References

External links

1978 births
Living people
Spanish male cyclists
Tour of Azerbaijan (Iran) winners
People from Campiña de Carmona
Sportspeople from the Province of Seville
Cyclists from Andalusia